Linyi Qiyang Airport  is an airport serving the city of Linyi in Shandong Province, China. It was formerly called Linyi Shubuling Airport until its renaming to Qiyang on 1 January 2020.

Airlines and destinations

Linyi Airport is served by the following airlines:

See also
List of airports in China
List of the busiest airports in China

References

Airports in Shandong
Transport in Linyi